Sofronie may refer to:

Name 
 Sofronie of Cioara, Romanian Orthodox saint
 Sofronie Drincec (born 1967), Romanian bishop
 Sofronie Vârnav, Moldavian and Romanian political figure, philanthropist, collector, and Orthodox clergyman
 Sofronie Vulpescu (1856 – 1923), Romanian cleric

Surname 
 Nicoleta Daniela Șofronie (born 1988), Romanian artistic gymnast

See also 
 Sofron
 Sofronije
 Sophronia (disambiguation)
 Sophronius (disambiguation)

Romanian masculine given names